Repetobasidiellum is a genus of fungi in the Hydnaceae family. It is a monotypic genus, containing the single species Repetobasidiellum fusisporum, which is widespread in northern Europe.

References

External links
 

Cantharellales
Fungi of Europe
Fungi described in 1981
Monotypic Basidiomycota genera